Manfredi Albanese Ginammi (born 25 July 2001) is an Italian professional rugby union player who primarily plays scrum-half for Benetton of the United Rugby Championship.

Professional career 
Albanese originally played for Lazio. He joined Calvisano in 2020, and joined  as a permit player for the latter stages of the 2021–22 United Rugby Championship although didn't make an appearance.

In 2020 and 2021 Albanese was named in Italy Under 20 squad for the annual Six Nations Under 20s Championship. On the 8 December 2021, he was selected by Alessandro Troncon to be part of an Emerging Italy 27-man squad for the 2021 end-of-year rugby union internationals.
On 10 January 2023, he was named in Italy A squad for a uncapped test against Romania A.

On the 30 May 2022, Albanese was selected by Kieran Crowley to be part of an Italy 33-man squad for the 2022 mid-year rugby union tests. He made his debut against Portugal.

On the 7th of March 2023 Albanese announced that he will retire from professional rugby at the end of the 2022-2023 season to move back to his native Rome and focus on a career in business.

References

External links 

2001 births
Living people
Italian rugby union players
Italy international rugby union players
S.S. Lazio Rugby 1927 players
Rugby Calvisano players
Zebre Parma players
Rugby union scrum-halves
Benetton Rugby players